A small waterplane area twin hull, better known by the acronym SWATH, is a catamaran design that minimizes hull cross section area at the sea's surface.  Minimizing the ship's volume near the surface area of the sea, where wave energy is located, minimizes a vessel's response to sea state, even in high seas and at high speeds.  The bulk of the displacement necessary to keep the ship afloat is located beneath the waves, where it is less affected by wave action.  Wave excitation drops exponentially as depth increases, so wave action normally does not affect a submerged submarine at all. Placing the majority of a ship's displacement under the waves is similar in concept to creating a ship that rides atop twin submarines.

Effects 

The twin-hull design provides a stable platform and large, broad decks.  Compared with conventional catamarans, SWATH vessels have more surface drag, but less wave drag. They are less susceptible to wave motion but more sensitive to payload, which affects draught. Additionally, SWATH vessels cannot operate in planing or semi-planing modes and thus gain no drag reduction when operating at speeds normally associated with such modes.They  require a complex control system, have a deeper draft, and have higher maintenance requirements. The design of SWATH vessels is also considerably more complex due to the structural complexities inherent to the design.

History 

The SWATH form was invented by Canadian Frederick G. Creed, who presented his idea in 1938, and was later awarded a British patent for it in 1946. The first full-scale SWATH vessel to be built and put into service was MV Duplus, a diving support vessel built in the Netherlands in 1968. Since the 1980s, oceanographic research vessels, pilot tenders, yachts and other craft are more routinely being built with the SWATH hull type.

Specific examples 

 Duplus (1969): oil industry support ship, the first SWATH ship built
 Sea Shadow (1984): US Navy experimental stealth ship
  (1988): Canadian Coast Guard survey ship
  (1988): lead ship of class of four US Navy surveillance ships that use a SURTASS
 Hibiki-class ocean surveillance ships, (1991): three patrol vessels operated by the Japan Maritime Self-Defense Force
  (ex-Radisson Diamond) (1992): cruise ship, largest SWATH when built, displaces 
  (1996): Monterey Bay Aquarium Research Institute mothership for the research ROV Doc Ricketts
 HSS 1500 (1996): class of three Finnish high speed ferries withdrawn after a decade due to high fuel consumption
  (2001): US Navy ocean surveillance ship that uses a SURTASS, additional ships cancelled
  (2001), University of Hawaii oceanographic research vessel
 Planet (2005): German Navy weapons and sonar research ship
 Sea Fighter (2005): US Navy experimental littoral combat ship
 Silver Cloud (2008):  private yacht
 NOAAS Ferdinand R. Hassler (2009), a NOAA hydrographic survey vessel
 Type 639 oceanographic surveillance ship (2009): class of six vessels for the Chinese Navy 
 M/V Susitna (2010): ice-capable convertible SWATH/barge
 Ghost (2011): experimental super-cavitating stealth ship
Skrunda-class patrol boat (2011): class of five  patrol vessels
 Iranian high-aspect-ratio twin-hull vessels

See also 

 
 
 
 , an experimental US Navy ship with multiple SWATH hulls.

References

External links 

Ship types

Catamarans